The Ministry of Health and Medical Services (MOH) is a government ministry of Fiji responsible for overseeing Fiji's Healthcare system. Its head office is in Dinem House in Toorak, Suva. The current Minister for Health and Medical Services is Ifereimi Waqainabete who was appointed to the position in November 2018.

Responsibilities 
The Ministry is tasked to provide quality healthcare to the people of Fiji. It does this through its 3 main Divisional Hospitals, 18 Sub-divisional Hospitals and over 80 Health Centres in which are operated by divisional and sub-divisional departments of the Ministry of Health. The Ministry is also tasked in enacting public health policies and overseeing the implementation of public health programmes.

Ministers

See also 

 Health in Fiji
 COVID-19 pandemic in Fiji

References

External links
 Ministry of Health and Medical Services

Fiji
Government of Fiji
Government ministries of Fiji